The UK Rock & Metal Singles Chart is a record chart which ranks the best-selling rock and heavy metal songs in the United Kingdom. Compiled and published by the Official Charts Company, the data is based on each track's weekly physical sales, digital downloads and streams. In 2014, there were 20 singles that topped the 52 published charts. The first number-one single of the year was "Rockstar" by Canadian Rock band Nickelback, which spent the  first two weeks of 2014 atop the chart. The final number-one single of the year was Bring Me the Horizon's "Drown".

The most successful song on the UK Rock & Metal Singles Chart in 2014 was "Centuries", the lead single from Fall Out Boy's sixth studio album American Beauty/American Psycho, which spent a total of eleven weeks at number one during the year, including a single run of nine consecutive weeks. Royal Blood also spent eleven weeks at number one in 2014, ten of which were for "Little Monster" (the other one for "Out of the Black"). Twin Atlantic spent seven weeks at number one with "Heart and Soul" (five weeks) and "Brothers and Sisters" (two weeks), while The Pretty Reckless were number one for three weeks with "Heaven Knows". Six artists – Nickelback, Guns N' Roses, You Me at Six, Linkin Park, Red Hot Chili Peppers and Foo Fighters – were number one on the chart for two weeks in 2014.

Chart history

See also
2014 in British music
List of UK Rock & Metal Albums Chart number ones of 2014

References

External links
Official UK Rock & Metal Singles Chart Top 40 at the Official Charts Company
The Official UK Top 40 Rock Singles at BBC Radio 1

2014 in British music
United Kingdom Rock and Metal Singles
2014